Hotel Del Portal was one of the early first-class hotels established by the Yosemite Valley Railroad to take passengers from  Merced to the terminus at El Portal, California, just outside of Yosemite National Park. The hotel set the standard for elegance in the Yosemite area. When automobiles replaced horses and wagons for transportation to Yosemite, business at the Del Portal Hotel started to slow. A fire destroyed the hotel in 1917.

History

Work on a four-story Hotel Del Portal began in the fall of 1907 and completed in 1908 by a subsidiary corporation of the Yosemite Valley Railroad.

The hotel was a $100,000 guest resort that had steam heat, electric lights, private baths at four or five dollars per day. The hotel set the standard for elegance in the Yosemite area. The hotel was a four-hour ride from Merced via a railway coach. The new hotel replaced a number of tents that had been the first lodging for passengers. When passengers arrived at the terminus at El Portal in the late afternoon, they spent the night at the Del Portal Hotel, then left to Yosemite Valley after breakfast the next morning.

On October 1, 1917, the Desmond Park Service moved to the Hotel Del Portal during the winter. The hotel was owned by the Yosemite Valley Railroad company, but the Desmond Company leased and operated it and the automobile stage line between El Portal and Yosemite Valley. The Desmond Park Service Company changed its name to the Yosemite National Park Company in December 1917 and was reorganized in 1920.

Automobile stages soon replaced horses and wagons for the transportation to the Yosemite. Business at the Del Portal Hotel started to slow down as passengers were loaded from the train at El Portal to buses that took them to Yosemite Valley. During World War 1, tourist travel slowed.

On October 27, 1917, a fire destroyed the hotel including the Desmond Company's records. The fire was started by a defective attic flue.

In April 1918, the new El Portal Inn replaced the Hotel Del Portal. The smaller and less elegant Inn was a two-story, twenty-room hotel. It was operated by the Yosemite Terminal Company, a subsidiary of the Yosemite Valley Railroad. On July 9, 1932, the El Portal Inn was burned down due to defective kitchen equipment. A new hotel, next to highway 140, was built by December 1932.

See also
 El Portal, California
 Yosemite National Park

External links
 Hotel Del Portal, Sunset Magazine (1911)

References

Yosemite National Park
Hotels in California
Hotel buildings completed in 1908
Hotels established in 1908
1908 establishments in California
National Park lodges